Sanchareswar Mahadev Temple is a temple of the lord Shiva in the Udaipur city in the state of Rajasthan, India.

General 
Sanchareswar Mahadev is a Hindu temple of Shiva, situated in Umarda village near Udaipur.

References 

Hindu temples in Rajasthan
Shiva temples in Rajasthan
Mewar
Tourist attractions in Udaipur district